NFDP

Veloo a/l Sinnathamby, better known as S. Veloo (born 9 November 1966) is a Malaysian football head coach,  for Malaysia U-17.

Career

As a coach
Veloo has coached in various levels in Malaysia, such as Johor state schoolboys football team, MASUM (Malaysian University Sports Council) football team, and the Football Association of Malaysia academy in Penang.

He had been an assistant coach in Penang FA since 2006, when he was handed the head coach job in late 2008. He held the job for only one year, before leaving at the end of the 2009 season. He later was appointed the head coach of USM FC, at that time a club who had just won promotion from 2009 Malaysia FAM League to 2010 Malaysia Premier League by finishing in 3rd place. Earlier in his career, he had coached the team from 1999 to 2001, back when they were competing in the Malaysia varsity league.

In the 2010 Malaysia Premier League the university club finished a respectable ninth out of 12 teams, avoiding relegation back to FAM League. The next season was even better for Veloo's team, finishing in mid-table 6th out of 12 team, barely missing the play-off spot to the 2011 Malaysia Cup tournament. In the 2012 Malaysia Premier League campaign, the team consolidated their place in the league with another mid-table finish, again at 6th place. Veloo also guided the team into round of 16 of 2012 Malaysia FA Cup, beating Pos Malaysia FC in the round of 32. They were beaten by eventual finalists Sime Darby FC.Formerly residing in Preston pursuing masters in sports coaching at UCLAN. Currently with NFDP. After a fine year at NFDP, He is now at Akademi Mokhtar Dahari as the U17 Malaysian National Team Coach

External links
 Veloo mahu catat sejarah
 Profile at Soccerway

References

Malaysian people of Indian descent
1966 births
Living people
People from Johor
Malaysian football managers